Vladimir Dragović (born 1967 in Belgrade, SR Serbia) is Professor and Head of the Mathematical Sciences Department at the University of Texas at Dallas. Prior to this he was a Full Research Professor at Serbian Academy of Sciences and Arts, the founder and president of the Dynamical Systems group and co-president of The Centre for Dynamical Systems, Geometry and Combinatorics of the Mathematical Institute of the Serbian Academy of Sciences and Arts.

Dragović graduated and received his Doctor of Sciences in Mathematics degree at the Faculty of Mathematics, University of Belgrade, in Belgrade, Serbia, former Socialist Federal Republic of Yugoslavia.  

Dragović is the author and co-author of numerous books and collections of problems for elementary and secondary schools, as well as special collections of assignments for preparation for mathematics competitions, and mathematics workbooks used as a preparation for admission to faculties.

Education
1987 B.Sc. in Mathematics, University of Belgrade (graduated in 3 years, instead of 4)
1988–1992 aspirant at Moscow State University, Faculty of Mechanics and Mathematics, Department for Higher Geometry and Topology
1992 Doctor of Sciences in Mathematics, University of Belgrade
Thesis: "R-matrices and algebraic curves", advisor: Boris Dubrovin, Moscow State University

Scientific work

Vladimir Dragović is the author of numerous research works in mathematics, mainly focused on algebraic geometric methods in dynamical systems theory. He is the coauthor, along with Milena Radnović, of the book
Poncelet Porisms and Beyond.

Chairman of the Seminar Mathematical Methods of Mechanics since its founding in 1993.
Advisor for four M.Sc. theses and three PhD theses at Department of Mathematics, University of Belgrade.
2001–2007 Member of the Committee for mathematics and mechanics of the Ministry for Science of Serbia
2002–2005 Leader of Project 1643 of the Ministry for Science of Serbia
since 2006 Leader of Project 144014 of the Ministry for Science of Serbia
since 2005 Leader of the Italian-Serbian project geometry, topology and combinatorics of manifolds and dynamical systems

Visiting Positions
1999–2000 Department of Mathematics, Kyoto University, Japan
2000–2003 International School for Advanced Studies (SISSA), Trieste, Italy
2008–present University of Lisbon, Portugal
2008 Institute of Advanced Scientific Studies (IHES), Paris, France

Invited lectures and addresses
2000	ITEF, Moscow, Russia
2004	ICTP, Trieste, Italy
2005	IMPA, Rio de Janeiro, Brazil
2005	ICTP, Trieste, Italy
2006	ICTP, Trieste, Italy
2006	University of Bielsko-Biała, Poland
2007	Montenegrin Academy of Sciences and Arts
2007	SISSA, Trieste, Italy
2007	University of Lisbon, Portugal
2008	Polytechnical University of Catalonia, Barcelona, Spain

Other academic positions and duties
1992–2007 Special professor (Teacher with special assignments, in special divisions for gifted pupils) in Mathematical Gymnasium Belgrade
2004–2008 Principal, Mathematical Gymnasium Belgrade
1993–1998 Faculty of Mathematics, University of Belgrade; courses: Differential Geometry, several graduate courses
1996–1999 Head of the Committee for mathematical competitions of high school students of Serbia
1996–1999 Department of Philosophy, University of Nis; courses: Differential Geometry, Partial Differential Equations
2003–2008 Department of Sciences and Mathematics, University of Montenegro; courses: Geometry, Analysis and Geometry on Riemann Surfaces, Integrable Dynamical Systems 1, Integrable Dynamical Systems 2
since 2004 regular associate member of ICTP Abdus Salam, Trieste, Italy
2004–2008 head of the Mathematical High School, Belgrade

Awards

 2004 Award of the Union of mathematical societies of Serbia and Montenegro for achievements in mathematical sciences for at most 40-year-old researchers.

References

External links 

 Matematička gimnazija
 prof. Boris Dubrovin, homepage at the International School for Advanced Studies – SISSA – Trieste, Italy
 Mathematical Institute of Serbian Academy of Sciences and Arts
 Official Biography of Full Research Professor dr sci Vladimir Dragović, from Mathematical Institute of Serbian Academy of Sciences and Arts

Academic staff of the University of Belgrade
University of Belgrade Faculty of Mathematics alumni
Heads of schools in Serbia
Serbian mathematicians
Scientists from Belgrade
1967 births
Living people
University of Texas faculty